Mowa may refer to the following places in India:

 Mowa, Gujarat on Saurashtra peninsula
 Mowa State, a former princely state of Kathiawar, with seat in the above town
 Mowa, Chhattisgarh

It may also refer to:
 MOWA Band of Choctaw Indians, a subgroup of the Choctaw group of Native Americans